Nejc Dežman (born 7 December 1992) is a retired Slovenian ski jumper.

Dežman's first World Cup performance was in Kulm in 2012. He received a gold medal at the 2012 Junior World Championships in individual normal hill.

References

1992 births
Living people
Sportspeople from Kranj
Slovenian male ski jumpers
21st-century Slovenian people